Jacques Jean Lhermitte (20 January 1877 – 24 January 1959) was a French neurologist and neuropsychiatrist.

Life 
Lhermitte was born in Mont-Saint-Père, Aisne, son of Léon Augustin Lhermitte, a French realist painter. Following his early education at Saint-Etienne, he studied in Paris and graduated in medicine in 1907. He specialised in neurology and became Chef-de-clinique (resident) for nervous diseases in 1908, Chef de laboratoire in 1910, and professeur agrégé for psychiatry 1922. He later became Médecin des Hôpitaux at the "Hospice Paul Brousse", head of the foundation "Dejerine", and clinical director at the Salpêtrière Hospital.
During World War I, Lhermitte studied spinal injuries and became interested in neuropsychiatry. This led to publications on visual hallucinations of the self. A deeply religious man, he explored the common territory between theology and medicine, and this led him to interesting studies on demonic possession and stigmatisation.

Medical eponyms 
Lhermitte was a noted clinical neurologist, and a number of medically relevant eponyms bear his name:

 Lhermitte sign: Flexion of the neck in patients with multiple sclerosis produces electric shock-like sensations that extend down the spine and may shoot into the limbs.
 Lhermitte peduncular hallucinosis: Purely visual hallucinations recognized as unreal, abnormal phenomena (preserved insight).
 Lhermitte syndrome: A rare syndrome of ocular palsy with nystagmus and paralysis of adduction during attempted lateral deviation of the eyes.
 Lhermitte-Cornil-Quesnel syndrome: A slowly progressive pyramidopallidal degeneration.
 Lhermitte-Duclos syndrome: A rare pathologic entity with  hypertrophy chiefly of the stratum granulosum of the cerebellum.
 Lhermitte-Lévy syndrome: A syndrome of slowly progressing paralysis after a stroke.
 Lhermitte-McAlpine syndrome: A combined pyramidal and extrapyramidal tract syndrome in middle-aged and elderly persons.
 Lhermitte-Trelles syndrome: A syndrome characterized by lymphoblastic infiltration of the peripheral nervous system, associated with paralysis and amyotrophy.

Bibliography

 Techniques anatomo-pathologiques du système nerveux. Paris, 1914.
 Psycho-névroses de guerre. Paris, 1916.
 Les blessures de la moelle épinière. Paris, 1917.
 La section totale de la moelle épinière. Paris, 1918.

 Les fondements biologiques de la psychologie. Paris, 1925.
 Les hallucinations: clinique et physiopathologie. Paris, 1951.
 True and false possession. Translated by the Hon. Patrick John Hepburne-Scott. New York: Hawthorn Books, 1963; OCLC Number 331062. London: Burns & Oates, 1963. Original edition: Vrais et faux possédés. Paris: Fayard, 1956; OCLC Number 13449338.

References

History of neuroscience
1877 births
1959 deaths
French psychiatrists
French neurologists